Craig Deans (born 7 May 1974) is an Australian former football (soccer) player and former head coach of the Newcastle Jets.

Playing career
Deans was a central defender for multiple Australian clubs, with most of his appearances coming in the National Soccer League. He made only two appearances in the A-League before a long period of injury Deans forced him into retirement as a professional player in 2007. He had success with the Perth Glory, winning two titles at the club.

Coaching career
In 2008, Deans became the inaugural youth team coach for the Newcastle Jets for their team in the new A-League National Youth League.

On 5 October 2011, he was appointed interim manager of the Newcastle Jets after the sacking of Branko Culina. He returned to his previous job when a full time manager was appointed.

In 2014 he took over the club's youth team, and then in 2015 he became the head coach of the Women's team.

In the 2015/16 W-League season he won the Coach of the Year award for rebuilding a Newcastle Jets team that had senior players Emily van Egmond, Hayley Crawford, Tori Huster, Angela Salem, Katherine Reynolds and Amber Neilson all exit the club in the off-season.

After the sacking of Ernie Merrick in Round 13 of the 2019/20 A-League season he once again took the role of interim manager. He had the role for 5 games, with 1 win, 1 draw and 3 defeats and did not apply for the role on a full-time basis. After Carl Robinson was appointed Deans went back to his usual role as an assistant coach.

Newcastle Jets Head Coaching Appointment
When Robinson joined the Western Sydney Wanderers after they had sacked Jean-Paul de Marigny prior to the start of the Covid delayed 2020/21 season, Deans once again took the interim head coaching role with his first game a 1–0 loss to the Central Coast Mariners on New Year's Eve, December 31, 2020. Unlike earlier occasions Deans applied to take over the head coaching role permanently. After 7 games his side had 2 wins, 1 draw and 4 losses then on Wednesday the 10th of February 2021 he was appointed on a two-year contract as the full time head coach.

On 3 June 2021, Deans announced that he would be resigning as the manager of the Newcastle Jets at the conclusion of the season.

Honours 
With Perth Glory:
 NSL Championship: 2002–2003, 2003–2004

With Newcastle Jets:
 W-League Coach of the Year : 2015–16

References

External links
 Newcastle Jets profile
 Oz Football profile

1974 births
Living people
Soccer players from Perth, Western Australia
Australian soccer players
A-League Men players
National Soccer League (Australia) players
Carlton S.C. players
Perth Glory FC players
Newcastle Jets FC players
Newcastle Jets FC managers
A-League Men managers
A-League Women managers
Association football defenders
Newcastle United Jets FC players
Australian soccer coaches